A mile square is a unit of measurement for area.

Mile Square or variation, also may refer to:

 Mile Square (Indianapolis), Downtown, Indianapolis, Indiana, USA; the historic district of downtown
 Hoboken, New Jersey, USA; nicknamed "Mile Square City"
 Mile Square Regional Park, Fountain Valley, California, USA
 Mile Square Road, Mendon, New York State, USA; see List of county routes in Monroe County, New York

See also

 Covina, California, USA; motto: One Mile Square and All There
 
 
 square mile (disambiguation)
 square (disambiguation)
 mile (disambiguation)